Chahal is a village in the Punjab province of Pakistan. It is located at 30°46'20N 74°10'20E with an altitude of 179 metres (590 feet).

References

Populated places in Kasur District